In enzymology, a bis(5'-nucleosyl)-tetraphosphatase (symmetrical) is an enzyme that catalyzes the chemical reaction

P1,P4-bis(5'-adenosyl) tetraphosphate + H2O  2 ADP

Thus, the two substrates of this enzyme are P1,P4-bis(5'-adenosyl) tetraphosphate and H2O, whereas its product is ADP.

This enzyme belongs to the family of hydrolases, specifically those acting on acid anhydrides in phosphorus-containing anhydrides.  The systematic name of this enzyme class is P1,P4-bis(5'-nucleosyl)-tetraphosphate nucleosidebisphosphohydrolase. Other names in common use include diadenosinetetraphosphatase (symmetrical), dinucleosidetetraphosphatasee (symmetrical), symmetrical diadenosine tetraphosphate hydrolase, adenosine tetraphosphate phosphodiesterase, Ap4A hydrolase, bis(5'-adenosyl) tetraphosphatase, diadenosine tetraphosphate hydrolase, diadenosine polyphosphate hydrolase, diadenosine 5',5-P1,P4-tetraphosphatase, diadenosinetetraphosphatase (symmetrical), 1-P,4-P-bis(5'-nucleosyl)-tetraphosphate, and nucleosidebisphosphohydrolase.  This enzyme participates in purine metabolism.

Structural studies

References

 
 

EC 3.6.1
Enzymes of known structure